The Broel Museum (Broelmuseum) was an art museum, focusing on classical and applied arts of the 18th - 19th century. It was located on the Buda Island in Kortrijk, Belgium.  The building was a converted 18th-century neoclassical mansion, located at 6 Broelkaai. The Treaty of Kortrijk was signed here in 1820. Since the end of 2014, the museum has closed its doors due to a lack of visitors. Under the name of 'Broelkaai 6', the location is being turned into a platform for visual arts, and is scheduled to reopen in 2018.  It was the intention to merge the collection of the closed Broel Museum with that of the museum Kortrijk 1302 which is dedicated to the history of the Battle of the Golden Spurs.

Exhibits
The main focus of the museum was works of artists from the Kortrijk area, or who are currently living in Kortijk, including; Roelant Savery, Jacob Savery, Karel van Mander, Kerstiaen De Keuninck, Louis-Pierre Verwee, Évariste Carpentier, Louis Robbe, Edward Woutermaertens, Vincent De Vos with a prominence of art from the 16th and 19th centuries.

Gallery of works

References

Art museums and galleries in Belgium
Buildings and structures in Kortrijk
Culture in Kortrijk
Art museums established in 1981
Neoclassical architecture in Belgium
1981 establishments in Belgium
Museums in West Flanders